Ambegaon is a town in Ambegaon tehsil of Pune district in the Indian state of Maharashtra.

References

Cities and towns in Pune district